Helene Kindberg (born 13 January 1998) is a Danish handball player who plays for Silkeborg-Voel KFUM and the Danish national team.

She was elected as the Best Right back in the Danish Women's Handball League in 2019/20.

Individual awards 
 Best Right back of Damehåndboldligaen: 2019/20

References

1998 births
Living people
Danish female handball players
Handball players from Stockholm